Flöha is a town in the district of Mittelsachsen, in Saxony, Germany.

Flöha station connects the town to Dresden, Chemnitz, Freiberg, Annaberg-Buchholz and other places.

History
During World War II, a subcamp of Flossenbürg concentration camp was located in Flöha. Flöha absorbed the former municipality Falkenau in 2011.

Sons and daughters of the city
 Lothar Kreyssig (1898–1986), founder of the Aktion Sühnezeichen, was born in Flöha
 Anita Nüßner (born 1935), canoeist (born in Plaue)
 Stefan Schmidt (born 1989), football goalkeeper

Personalities who have worked in the city

 Samuel von Pufendorf (1632–1694), natural law philosopher, historian and natural and international law teacher, 
 Herbert Jobst (1915–1990), writer
 Marcus Popp (born 1981), volleyball player

References

 
Mittelsachsen